Dolisie Airport  is an airport serving the city of Dolisie, Republic of the Congo. The city was known as Loubomo until 1991.

The Dolisie non-directional beacon (Ident: LO) is located on the field.

See also

 List of airports in the Republic of the Congo
 Transport in the Republic of the Congo

References

External links
OpenStreetMap - Dolisie
SkyVector - Dolisie Airport

Airports in the Republic of the Congo